The 2010–11 Coventry Blaze season was the 8th season for the Coventry Blaze in the British Elite Ice Hockey League (EIHL).

Player roster & transfers 2010–11

Player roster

The Coventry Blaze roster for the 2010–11 season.

Player transfers
Players leaving and joining the club for the 2010–11 season.

Fixtures & results 2010–11

Elite Ice Hockey League

Coventry Blaze completed the regular season in 6th place overall to qualify for the playoffs.

 Green background indicates win (2 points).
 Red background indicates regulation loss (0 points).
 White background indicates overtime/shootout loss (1 point).

Playoffs

Coventry Blaze failed to reach the Playoff Finals weekend in Nottingham after losing to Belfast Giants in the quarter finals 4–3 on aggregate.

 White background indicates tied game.
 Red background indicates loss.

Challenge Cup

Coventry Blaze failed to reach the knockout stages of the Challenge Cup after finishing 4th in their qualifying group.

 Green background indicates win (2 points).
 Red background indicates loss (0 points).
 White background indicates tied game (1 point).

Continental Cup

Coventry Blaze entered the Continental Cup as EIHL champions in 2009–10. They failed to reach the super-final after finishing as runners-up in their qualifying group.

 Green background indicates win (3 points).
 Red background indicates regulation loss (0 points).
 White background indicates overtime/shootout loss (1 point).

Pre-season & Exhibition
 Green background indicates win.
 Red background indicates loss.
 White background indicates tied game.

Aladdin 20-20 Cup
The Aladdin 20-20 Cup was a mini tournament held at NIC, Nottingham on 12 March 2011. Coventry, Nottingham, Sheffield and Braehead took part.

The tournament consisted of 6 round robin games with each team playing each other once. Each game lasted for twenty minutes, running clock with two points for a win and one for a draw. The sides with the best records then progressed to the Grand Final to play for the trophy and the winners' cheque.

Coventry Blaze won one of their round robin games against Sheffield Steelers and failed to reach the cup final. The tournament was won by Braehead Clan.

Team statistics 2010–11

Player statistics
Player statistics for season 2010-11 (includes Challenge Cup & playoff games).

Team statistics
Team statistics for season 2010-11 (includes Challenge Cup & playoff games).

Honours & awards
Below is a list of the major titles and honours awarded to Coventry Blaze in 2010–11.

Elite Ice Hockey League Second team All-Stars
 2010-11 Luke Fulghum

References

Cov
Coventry Blaze seasons